Stall may refer to:

Enclosures
 Animal stall, an enclosure for an animal
 Restroom stall, an enclosure providing privacy to the user of a single toilet in a public restroom
 Market stall, a makeshift or mobile structures for selling market goods or serving food
 Choir stall, seating in a church for the choir
 Stalls (theatre), the ground floor seats in a theatre/cinema (closer to or directly in front of the stage)

Science and computing
 Stall (engine), the unexpected or unwanted stopping of an engine
 Stall (fluid dynamics), the fairly sudden loss of effectiveness of an aerodynamic surface
 Compressor stall, the sudden loss of compression in a jet engine
 Pipeline stall, in computing

Places
 Stall, Austria, a town in the district of Spittal an der Drau in Carinthia

People
 Sylvanus Stall (1847–1915), American pastor

Art and entertainment
The Stall (Seinfeld), a TV episode
"Stall", a 1997 song by Sarge

See also
Stalling (disambiguation)